This page provides summaries to the 1999 COSAFA Cup.

Qualifying round

First round
Winners of the first round advanced to the quarter-finals; losers advanced to the second round.

Second round
Losers of the first round competed for the remaining two spots for the quarter-finals.

Final round
Zambia and Zimbabwe received byes to the quarter-finals.

Quarter-finals

Semi-finals

Final

External links
 details at RSSSF archives

Cosafa Cup, 1999
COSAFA Cup